Shearline Boatworks is a Morehead City, North Carolina based boat manufacturer. The computer designed boats are built around a wooden core using epoxy and cloth. The custom center-console boats are computer design and made by hand. The company is owned by Mason Cox III and Chip King. The boats style is referred to as Carolina.

References

Companies based in North Carolina
Manufacturing companies based in North Carolina